The Quinnipiac Bobcats men's basketball team represents Quinnipiac University in Hamden, Connecticut, United States. The school's team currently competes in the Metro Atlantic Athletic Conference. They are currently coached by Baker Dunleavy, formerly the associate head coach at Villanova, and play their home games at the M&T Bank Arena.

History

1996–2007
Joe DeSantis was the fifth head coach in Quinnipiac history. He led the Bobcats during their transition from Division II to Division I.
DeSantis's best season was in 1999–2000 when the team went 18–10 and DeSantis won NEC Coach of The Year. On March 8, 2007, DeSantis was fired after 11 years.

His record was 118–188.

2007–2017
Tom Moore was hired in 2007 to replace Joe DeSantis. In Moore's first season, the team went 15–15 and finished fifth in the Northeast Conference. After a 15–16 2008–09 season, Moore and the Bobcats went 23–10, finishing first in the Northeast conference, but failed to win the conference tournament. The team received a bid to the NIT, losing in the first round to Virginia Tech, 81–61. The next season the Bobcats went 22–10 and earned a bid to the CIT, losing in the first round to Buffalo, 75–68. In 2011–12 the team finished 18–14, earned a bid to the CBI, and lost in the first round to Pennsylvania, 74–63. In 2013 Quinnipiac moved to the Metro Atlantic and went 20–12 in their first season. They earned a bid to the CIT and lost in the first round to Yale, 69–68. Moore was fired on March 7, 2017.

Postseason

NCAA Division II Tournament results
The Bobcats have appeared in four NCAA Division II Tournaments. Their combined record is 01-7.

NAIA Tournament results
The Bobcats have appeared in two NAIA Tournaments. Their combined record is 1–2.

NIT results
The Bobcats have appeared in the National Invitation Tournament (NIT) one time. Their record is 0–1.

CBI results
The Bobcats have appeared in the College Basketball Invitational (CBI) one time. Their record is 0–1.

CIT results
The Bobcats have appeared in the CollegeInsider.com Postseason Tournament (CIT) three times. Their combined record is 0–3.

Bobcats playing in international leagues

 Evan Conti (born 1993), American-Israeli basketball player and coach

References

External links